Wayne Chang (born August 3, 1983) is an American entrepreneur, angel investor, film producer, and philanthropist. He is best known for founding Crashlytics, a startup acquired by Twitter in 2013. He is also known for creating a filesharing network called i2hub, making various seed investments, and his lawsuit against the Winklevoss brothers.

Early life
Chang was born in Taipei, Taiwan, and grew up extremely poor on a farm in rural Taiwan. At age 6, he immigrated to the United States. However, in the States, things weren't that much better. He didn't have his own bed until he was 16.

Despite that, Chang displayed a natural talent for technology. He wrote his first software program on the Apple IIe at age 7. While attending a high school in Haverhill, Massachusetts, he was involved with Napster, the first peer-to-peer filesharing platform. In 2005, Newsweek profiled Chang for his abilities in technology.

Education
Chang enrolled as an undergraduate student at University of Massachusetts Amherst. As a student, he hacked into the computer systems and obtained the encrypted passwords of everyone on campus. After bypassing the encryption methods, the Office of Information Technology declined to press charges if Chang would share his methods. Chang also established a startup, i2hub, during his time at the university. To pursue his startup passions, he dropped out of college.

In 2016, despite not having a bachelor's degree or master's degree, Chang was awarded an honorary doctorate by University of Massachusetts Amherst. He was also the featured Commencement Speaker for the 2016 graduating class for University of Massachusetts Amherst.

Digits
Chang co-founded Digits with previous Crashlytics co-founder Jeff Seibert in 2018. Digits is developing advanced, real-time technology for businesses. In November 2019, Digits announced a $10.5 million Series A from Benchmark and 72 angels including Aaron Levie, Ali Rowghani, Anthony Noto, April Underwood, Brian Lee (entrepreneur), David Cancel, Dick Costolo, Jeff Orlowski, Jordan Fliegel, Justin Kan, Katie Jacobs Stanton, Katrina Lake, Kimber Lockhart, Michelle Dipp, Nat Friedman, and Sean Christie. In April 2020 Digits announced it had raised $22 million Series B from GV and Benchmark.

In October 2020, Embroker "sought out startups across over 40 industries around the world to rank the fastest-growing companies that we believe will fundamentally transform our society." It ranked Digits #6 on its top 200 startups.

Crashlytics
Chang co-founded Crashlytics, a mobile company building crash reporting for iOS and Android, with Jeff Seibert in 2011. Crashlytics raised $1 million from venture capitalists Flybridge Capital Partners and Baseline Ventures as well as individual angel investors David Chang, Lars Albright, Jennifer Lum, Peter Wernau, Roy Rodenstein, Chris Sheehan, Ty Danco, Joe Caruso, and others. In April 2012, Crashlytics raised another $5 million from Flybridge Capital Partners and Baseline Ventures.

Crashlytics has been installed on over 2.9 billion active devices and is the #1 most installed SDK for performance. Its Answers product became #1 in mobile analytics—beating out Google Analytics.

In January 2013, Twitter acquired Crashlytics for over $100 million. Most of the package was in stock vesting over four years with an upfront payment of $38.2 million in common Twitter stock.

In January 2017, Google acquired Crashlytics from Twitter.

i2hub
Chang created i2hub in his dorm room at the University of Massachusetts Amherst. According to Chang, he started i2hub with the idea that college students should have an avenue to interact with each other. He had started it in February 2003 for a month but shut it down due to its popularity. He then restarted it in March 2004, when he was better prepared for the traffic.

Facebook also had just launched in February 2004, a month before i2hub. Both i2hub and Facebook were gaining attention from the press. In August 2004, Mark Zuckerberg, Andrew McCollum, Adam D'Angelo, and Sean Parker of Facebook launched a competing peer-to-peer file sharing service called Wirehog.  Traction was low compared to i2hub, and Facebook ultimately shut it down.

As users flocked to the service, it attracted the attention of ConnectU and founders Cameron Winklevoss, Tyler Winklevoss, and Divya Narendra. A partnership allegedly formed between i2hub and ConnectU. The partnership, called The Winklevoss Chang Group, jointly advertised their properties through bus advertisements as well as press releases. i2hub integrated its popular software with ConnectU's website, as part of the partnership. The team also jointly launched several projects and initiatives.

Due to legal pressure, on November 14, 2005, i2hub was shut down.

Facebook, ConnectU, and Winklevoss lawsuits
On December 21, 2009, Wayne Chang and The i2hub Organization launched a lawsuit against ConnectU and its founders, seeking 50% of the settlement. The complaint says, "The Winklevosses and Howard Winklevoss filed [a] patent application, U.S. Patent Application No. 20060212395, on or around March 15, 2005, but did not list Chang as a co-inventor."  It also states, "Through this litigation, Chang asserts his ownership interest in The Winklevoss Chang Group and ConnectU, including the settlement proceeds."  Lee Gesmer of the firm Gesmer Updegrove posted the detailed 33-page complaint online.

On May 13, 2011, it was reported that Judge Peter Lauriat made a ruling against the Winklevosses. Chang's case against them could proceed. The Winklevosses had argued that the court lacks jurisdiction because the settlement with Facebook has not been distributed and therefore Chang hasn't suffered any injury. Judge Lauriat wrote, "The flaw in this argument is that defendants appear to conflate loss of the settlement proceed with loss of rights. Chang alleges that he has received nothing in return for the substantial benefits he provided to ConnectU, including the value of his work, as well as i2hub's users and goodwill." Lauriat also wrote that, although Chang's claims to the settlement are "too speculative to confer standing, his claims with respect to an ownership in ConnectU are not. They constitute an injury separate and distinct from his possible share of the settlement proceeds. The court concludes that Chang has pled sufficient facts to confer standing with respect to his claims against the Winklevoss defendants."

ConnectU sued Facebook in early 2004. Facebook countersued in regards to the team's Social Butterfly project, and named among the defendants ConnectU, Cameron Winklevoss, Tyler Winklevoss, Divya Narendra, and Wayne Chang. A settlement was reached where Facebook acquired ConnectU for 1,253,326 shares of Facebook stock and an additional $20 million in cash.

In 2014, Superior Court Judge Thomas P. Billings, going against the other judges on the state's Business Litigation Session bench, dismissed both Chang's "options claims" and "partnership claims". Chang's lawyer, Alan D. Rose Jr., said "we respectfully disagree with the decision and will appeal."

Other Startups
Besides founding his own startups, Chang has been involved in dozens of companies in different capacities including angel investors, board members, or advisors. These companies include JetSmarter, Draftkings, Gusto, Dropbox, SoFi, Planet Labs, AirHelp, LovePop, Muzik, OnSwipe, Triggerfox, Kite, Pistol Lake, Blispay, Homemade, Notarize, Reaction Housing, NS1, ValiMail, Stream, NextCaller, Adored, Slash Keyboard, SURKUS, Tablelist, Boomset, Opendoor, Marble Robotics, and Uplevel Security.

Limited Partner in Venture Funds
Chang is a Limited Partner in several funds. The funds include:
 Baseline Ventures (investments include Instagram, Weebly, OMGPop, ExactTarget, and Heroku)
 137 Ventures (investments include tumblr, Spotify, Palantir, and Hyperloop One)
 Boston Seed Capital (investments include Draftkings, BostInno, Shareaholic, RunKeeper)
 Where Fund
 Launch Angels

Films

Wicked Magic Productions 
In 2017, Wayne Chang teamed up with Paul English (co-founder Kayak, sold to Priceline for ~$2 billion) to start Wicked Magic Productions. Their first movie together is Dear Dictator, a film starring Katie Holmes, Michael Caine, Jason Biggs, Seth Green and Odeya Rush.

Chasing Coral 
Chang is also an Associate Producer for award-winning climate change documentary Chasing Coral, which won an award at Sundance Film Festival in 2017. Netflix announced it had acquired the film at the festival and it is now a Netflix Original. It debuted on Netflix in July 2017. Movie review site Rotten Tomatoes gives it a 100% rating.

Frame by Frame 
Prior to Chasing Coral, Chang is also an Associate Producer for award-winning documentary Frame by Frame. It premiered at SXSW in 2015 and subsequently went on to win many awards. The Hollywood Reporter called Frame by Frame "a work of profound immediacy, in sync with the photographers' commitment and hope"  and BBC Culture proclaimed "the film features photographers passionate about telling stories of the true identity of Afghanistan – whether they are newsworthy or not." In 2016, Time, Inc acquired the documentary. It has a 92% rating on Rotten Tomatoes.

Awards 
40 under 40 by Boston Business Journal.

Most Eligible Bachelor by The Improper Bostonian.

Honorary doctorate (PhD) from the University of Massachusetts Amherst.

Commencement Speaker for the  Graduating Class of 2016 for the University of Massachusetts Amherst.

Named one of 30 Most Disruptive People in Tech by Boston Magazine.

Nominated Entrepreneur of the Year in 2013 by New England Venture Capital Association.

Nominated Angel of the Year in 2015 and in 2016 by New England Venture Capital Association.

Pop culture
 
In Spring 2001, The Boston Globe profiled Wayne Chang in "e-Files".

In Spring 2005, Newsweek profiled Chang in their issue, "The College Vanguard: 15 Students You Don't Know... But Will".

In April 2005, the press, including USA Today, The Washington Post and Boston Globe, reported that the Recording Industry Association of America was filing lawsuits against users of i2hub.

In July 2005, Chang was featured in CBS Sunday Morning News segment called "Networth".

In August 2005, Chang was profiled by Boston Globe's Business section, "Software wiz follows dream out of college".

In October 2005, The Daily Free Press wrote an article in their business section, "Wayne's World".

In November 2005, the press, including MSNBC, BBC News and Boston Business Journal reported that Wayne Chang shut down i2hub.

In August 2009, Chang spoke at an entrepreneur panel for The National Association of Asian American Professionals.

In October 2010, the film The Social Network was released. The film depicts the battle between ConnectU and Facebook, which included the settlement at the end of the film that is the subject matter of the Chang v. Winklevoss case.

On December 14, 2010, ABC News wrote an article reporting on The Winklevoss Chang Group dispute, "Man Says Twins Who Sued Facebook 'Backstabbed' Him, Sues for Settlement Money".

On December 16, 2010, Time Magazine wrote an article on The Winklevoss Chang Group dispute, "Facebook Watch: Former Business Partner Sues the Winklevi".

On December 31, 2010, The New York Times wrote a front-page article on the Facebook lawsuits. Chang was mentioned in the blog post.

In January 2011, BusinessWire and TechCrunch reported that Chang invested in OnSwipe's $1M seed round, along with Spark Capital, SV Angel, Betaworks, Eniac Ventures, Morado Ventures, Dharmesh Shah, Jennifer Lum, and Roy Rodenstein.

References

Living people
1983 births
American computer programmers
American computer businesspeople
File sharing
University of Massachusetts Amherst alumni
Businesspeople in software
Businesspeople from Massachusetts
Businesspeople from Taipei
Taiwanese emigrants to the United States
American people of Chinese descent